In Greek mythology, Aegleis was a daughter of Hyacinthus who had emigrated from Lacedaemon to Athens. During the siege of Athens by Minos, in the reign of Aegeus, she was with her sisters Antheis, Lytaea, and Orthaea, were sacrificed on the tomb of Geraestus the Cyclops, for the purpose of averting a pestilence then raging at Athens.

Notes

References 

 Apollodorus, The Library with an English Translation by Sir James George Frazer, F.B.A., F.R.S. in 2 Volumes, Cambridge, MA, Harvard University Press; London, William Heinemann Ltd. 1921. ISBN 0-674-99135-4. Online version at the Perseus Digital Library. Greek text available from the same website.
Bell, Robert E., Women of Classical Mythology: A Biographical Dictionary. ABC-Clio. 1991. .

Women in Greek mythology
Attican characters in Greek mythology